Hammerhead may refer to:

 The head of a hammer

Commercial 
 Hammerhead (company), is an independently-run subsidiary of SRAM Corporation in Brooklyn, New York City, USA, developing, producing and selling cyclocomputers and supplies.

Fiction 
 Hammerhead (comics), a Marvel Comics foe of Spider-Man
 Hammerhead (film), a 1968 film based on the novel by James Mayo
 Hammerhead: Shark Frenzy a 2005 TV movie starring William Forsythe, Jeffery Combs and Hunter Tylo
 Hammerhead (1987 film), a 1987 Italian action film directed by Enzo G. Castellari
 Hammerhead (novel), a 1964 Charles Hood secret agent novel by James Mayo
 Hammerhead Hannigan, the leader of Taurus Bulba's henchmen in the television cartoon series Darkwing Duck
 Hammerhead, a Rulon character from the TV cartoon Dino-Riders
 Hammerhead, the nickname for the Star Wars character Momaw Nadon
 Hammerheads, a 1990 book by Dale Brown
 The  Hammerhead, an alien species living on Pandora in James Cameron's science-fiction film Avatar
 James Bond 007: Hammerhead, a 2016 James Bond comic book by Dynamite Entertainment

Games and rides 
 Hammerhead, a heavy helicopter gunship in the video game Command & Conquer 3: Kane's Wrath
 Hammer Heads, a 2006 computer game from Pop Cap Games
 Hammerhead (attraction), a former ride at Knott's Berry Farm, now defunct
 Hammerhead, a monster truck present in various titles of the Twisted Metal series of video games
 Hammerhead, the most prominent gas station and repair shop in the game Final Fantasy XV

Music 
 Hammerhead (band), noise rock band
 "Hammerhead" (Jeff Beck song), 2010
 Hammerhead (EP), a 2006 EP by Solace, or the title track
 "Hammerhead" (The Offspring song), 2008
 "Hammerhead" (Tin Machine song), from the 1991 album Tin Machine II
 "Hammerhead" (James Reyne song), 1987
 "Hammerhead", a song from the John Zorn album Naked City
 "Hammerhead", an instrumental by Pat Travers from the album Heat in the Street
 "Hammerhead", from the 1986 album Doomsday for the Deceiver, by Flotsam & Jetsam

Science and technology 
 Hammerhead shark (genus Sphyrna), of which there are nine known species
 Hammerkop (Scopus umbretta), a bird of order Ciconiiformes, may also be known as a hammerhead
 Hammerhead ribozyme, which can catalyze the sequence-specific cleavage of RNA phosphodiester bonds
 Hammerhead crane, a type of crane
 Hammerhead worm
 Google Nexus 5, an Android handset with the code name Hammerhead

Sports 
 Jupiter Hammerheads, a minor league baseball team based in Jupiter, Florida
 Wilmington Hammerheads FC, a minor league soccer team based in Wilmington, North Carolina
 Corpus Christi Hammerheads, a professional arena football team
 Hammerhead turn or stall turn, an aerobatic maneuver
 Hammerhead (mascot), mascot of the British football club West Ham United

United States Navy submarines 
 , a Gato-class submarine, commissioned in 1944
 , a Sturgeon-class submarine, commissioned in 1968 and struck in 1995